Lia Rumantscha is an organization that promotes Romansh language usage and study.

Established in 1919, its seat is in Chur.

External links
 Website
 Lia Rumantscha in English

Romansh language
Language regulators
Chur
Cultural organisations based in Switzerland